Chris Cox is an American voice actor who has worked on films, animated television series, and video games.

Career
In television, he is best known for his work in Family Guy. He is also known for his work in Jak and Daxter, Skylanders, Batman: Arkham, and several Marvel, DC, and Star Wars titles. He co-created, co-wrote, and produced the reality TV program Small Shots which ran from 2001 to 2003. He was a writer for the 2005 television series Con, a supervising producer for the 2006 television sitcom Free Ride, and a writer for the 2007 webseries Voicemail.

Filmography

Film

Television

Video games

Other

References

External links
 

Living people
American male voice actors
American male television actors
American male video game actors
American male film actors
American male web series actors
American television writers
American television producers
Oklahoma State University alumni
American male television writers
Year of birth missing (living people)